Suffolk Construction Company stylized as Suffolk is  an American construction contracting company based in Boston, Massachusetts with additional locations in California, Florida, New York and Texas. The company is contracted for work in the aviation, commercial, education, healthcare, gaming and government sectors. Suffolk is the largest construction contractor in Massachusetts and one of the 20 largest in the country. In 2018, Forbes reported that the company is the 148th largest private company in the U.S. That same year, Suffolk was ranked 23rd on Engineering News-Record's "Top 400 Contractors" list.

History 
Suffolk Construction Company was founded in 1982, by Edward Fish Sr. as an open-shop building contractor. Immediately thereafter, Fish seeded Suffolk with an $80,000 loan and transferred full leadership and management to his 23-year-old son, John F. Fish, who has led the company as president and CEO since its founding.

By 1987, the company had grown its annual revenues from $300 thousand to $66 million. In 1989, the company expanded its operations to South Florida.

Suffolk reached an agreement with Boston's carpentry union in 1993, in which it agreed to use union workers in downtown Boston, but would remain non-union in other areas. In 1999, Suffolk reached a larger deal with the carpentry union in which it agreed to use union workers throughout the New England area. 

In 2009, Suffolk acquired William A. Berry & Son, a large New England contractor that specialized in biomedical and healthcare construction. Suffolk acquired the San Diego-based ROEL Construction in January 2011 in an effort to expand its growth in California.

In January 2016, the company was selected as general contractor for the $1.7 billion Wynn Resorts casino in Everett, Massachusetts. In September 2016, the company held a ceremony in which they used virtual reality technology to "break ground" on their new headquarters project. Suffolk was chosen as the general contractor for the General Electric's Boston headquarters building in December 2016.

Notable projects
William D. Mullins Memorial Center
360 State Street
340 Fremont Street 
Jade Signature
Millennium Tower (Boston)
Encore Boston Harbor
Seminole Hard Rock Hotel and Casino Tampa
MiamiCentral

References

External links
 Official website
Companies based in Boston
Construction and civil engineering companies of the United States
Privately held companies based in Massachusetts